Tula may refer to:

Geography

Antarctica
Tula Mountains
Tula Point

India
Tulā, a solar month in the traditional Indian calendar

Iran
Tula, Iran, a village in Hormozgan Province

Italy
Tula, Sardinia, municipality (comune) in the province of Sassari, Italy

Kenya
Garba Tula, town in Northern Kenya
Garba Tula Airport

Mexico
Atotonilco de Tula, city and municipality of Hidalgo
Roman Catholic Diocese of Tula
Tula (Mesoamerican site), the Toltec capital
Tula de Allende, the modern city in Hidalgo state
Tula, Tamaulipas, town in the state of Tamaulipas
Tula Municipality, municipality of Tamaulipas
Tula River, in central Mexico
Unión de Tula, municipality in Jalisco in central-western Mexico

Mongolia
Tula, also Tola, variant transcriptions of Tuul River

Russia
Tula Oblast, a federal subject of Russia
Tula, Russia, a city and the administrative center of Tula Oblast
 Klokovo (air base), a Russian Air Force airbase near the above city
Tula Governorate, administrative division of the Russian Empire (1796–1929)
Tula electoral district (Russian Constituent Assembly election, 1917)

United States
Tula, Mississippi, unincorporated place in Lafayette County
Tula, American Samoa, a village in eastern Tutuila

People
Tula people, Native American tribe
Tula language, Savanna language of eastern Nigeria

First names
Tula (Curaçao) (fl. 1795), leader of the Curaçao slave revolt
Rao Tula Ram (1825–1863), Indian rebellion leader
Tula Benites, Peruvian politician
Tula Giannini, American academic and musicologist
Tula Lotay, pen name of English comic book writer Lisa Wood
Tula Rodríguez, Peruvian dancer, actress and model
Tula Small (born 1984), Australian singer/songwriter and TV personality
Tulisa (born 1988), full name Tula Paulinea Contostavlos, English singer/songwriter, actress, and TV personality

Surnames
Cristian Tula (born 1978), Argentine football player
Turab Tula (1918–1990), Soviet Uzbek writer

Stagenames
Caroline Cossey a.k.a. "Tula" (born 1954), an English model, transgender woman, and documentary producer
Tula (1903–1992), Native American dancer, birth name Gertrude Prokosch Kurath

Other uses
"Tula", track from the 1994 Cusco album Apurimac II
Tula massacre, 1981 incident in the Mexican state of Hidalgo
8985 Tula, main-belt asteroid
Russian submarine K-114 Tula, Russian nuclear-powered ballistic missile submarine
Tula: The Revolt, a 2013 historical drama film of the slave revolt led by Tula
Tula Arms Plant, a Russian weapons manufacturer
Tula (brig), ship of the English mariner and explorer John Biscoe (1794–1843)
Tula pryanik, type of Russian gingerbread
Tula, pink Hoob on the popular children's TV show
Tula, the real name of superheroine Aquagirl from DC Comics
Tula Springs, fictional town in a series of novels by the James Wilcox
Tula prison break, a 2021 prison escape in Tula de Allende, Hidalgo, Mexico
Tula, synonym of the genus Nolana in the family Solanaceae
Tula, Chilean Spanish slang for "penis"
 Tula, a month in the Darian calendar

See also

Tola (disambiguation)
Tulsky (disambiguation)
Toula (disambiguation)
Thule

Language and nationality disambiguation pages